The 2011 Miami Hurricanes football team represented the University of Miami during the 2011 NCAA Division I FBS football season. It was the Hurricanes' 86th season of football and 8th as a member of the Atlantic Coast Conference. The Hurricanes were led by first-year head coach Al Golden and played their home games at Sun Life Stadium. They finished the season 6–6 overall and 3–5 in the ACC to finish in a two-way tie for fourth place in the Coastal Division. The Hurricanes served a self-imposed bowl ban due to an ongoing NCAA investigation.

Schedule

Personnel

Coaching staff

Support staff

Roster

Depth chart

Preseason

Scandal

The Hurricanes faced adversity even before the first down of football as twelve players were forced to pay restitution and eight players were suspended for accepting money and gifts from former booster Nevin Shapiro, a convicted Ponzi schemer serving a 20-year prison sentence. The players suspended were Jacory Harris (one game), Sean Spence (one game), Travis Benjamin (one game), Marcus Forston (one game), Adewale Ojomo (one game), Ray-Ray Armstrong (four games), Dyron Dye (four games), and Olivier Vernon (six games).

On November 20, Miami announced it was withdrawing from bowl consideration due to an ongoing NCAA investigation into the Shapiro affair.

Regular season

Maryland

Al Golden's first game as head coach.

Ohio State

Kansas State

Bethune-Cookman

Virginia Tech

North Carolina

Georgia Tech

Virginia

Duke

Florida State

South Florida

Boston College

References

Miami
Miami Hurricanes football seasons
Miami Hurricanes football